Luis Francisco Guajardo Valderas (born 30 July 1973) is a Chilean former footballer who played as a midfielder for Deportes Concepción, Colo-Colo, Rangers, Puerto Montt and Santiago Wanderers in Chile.

Honours

Player
Deportes Concepción
 Segunda División de Chile: 1994

References
 

1973 births
Living people
People from Punta Arenas
Chilean footballers
Association football midfielders
Colo-Colo footballers
Puerto Montt footballers
Rangers de Talca footballers
Deportes Concepción (Chile) footballers
Santiago Wanderers footballers
Chilean Primera División players
Primera B de Chile players